There are more than 50 completed high-rises in Oklahoma City, most of which stand in the central business district. In the city, 25 buildings stand  and taller. Other notable skyscrapers are Chase Tower and First National Center, which stand as the second and third-tallest buildings in Oklahoma City, respectively. Five of the 10 tallest buildings in Oklahoma are located in Oklahoma City.

The history of skyscrapers in Oklahoma City began with the completion of the Colcord Hotel, Oklahoma City's first skyscraper. After oil was discovered in the area, the population of Oklahoma City grew significantly. As a result, the city's skyline expanded, which featured a "race to the top" with the synchronous construction of First National Center and City Place Tower in the central business district. Contemporary skyscrapers began to be built in the north and west sides of Oklahoma City, and later in the downtown area. In 1993, Oklahoma City voters approved the MAPS (Metropolitan Area Projects) program, which featured the construction of several  distinct domestic facilities and restorations and expansions of other older ones. It was completed in 2004 and is deemed to be the first program of its kind for a city the size of Oklahoma City.

It has also become the tallest building in the state of Oklahoma, surpassing the BOK Tower in Tulsa.

Tallest buildings
The "Year" column indicates the year in which a building was completed.

Proposed
This lists buildings that are either Proposed or actively Under Design Review with the City of Oklahoma City and are planned to rise at least .

Timeline of tallest buildings
This table lists buildings that once held the title of tallest building in Oklahoma City as well as the current titleholder, Devon Energy World Headquarters.

See also
 List of tallest buildings in Oklahoma 
 the United States
 the world

References

General
 

Specific

External links

 Diagram of Oklahoma City skyscrapers on SkyscraperPage

Oklahoma City
Buildings and structures in Oklahoma City
Tallest